Tsvetomir Parvanov (Bulgarian: Цветомир Първанов; born 11 January 1962) is a Bulgarian former footballer and manager.

Career

Amassing more than 200 matches in the A PFG, Parvanov represented Yantra Gabrovo, Etar, Shumen, Olympik Teteven and Beroe. With the "violets" from Veliko Tarnovo he became champion of Bulgaria in 1991.

References

1962 births
Living people
Association football defenders
Bulgarian footballers
FC Yantra Gabrovo players
PFC Beroe Stara Zagora players
FC Etar Veliko Tarnovo players
First Professional Football League (Bulgaria) players
People from Gabrovo